The marbled water monitor (Varanus marmoratus), also known commonly as the Philippine water monitor, is a large species of monitor lizard in the family Varanidae. The species is endemic to the Philippines.

Description

Geographic range
The marbled water monitor lizard is found on various islands of the noveleta, including Batanes Islands, Babuyan Islands, northern and central Luzon and Lubang Island.

Reproduction
Varanus marmoratus is oviparous.

Taxonomy
The monitor lizard from Palawan, Mindoro, southern Luzon and the Sulu Archipelago was recently described as a new species, Varanus palawanensis.

See also
Asian water monitor

References

Further reading
Deraniyagala PEP (1944). "Four New Races of the Kabaragoya Lizard Varanus salvator ". Spolia Zeylanica 24: 59-62. (Varanus salvator philippinensis, new subspecies). 
Gaulke M (1999). "Die Herpetofauna von Calauit Island (Calamianes-Inseln, Provinz Palawan, Philippinen) (Amphibia et Reptilia)". Faun. Abh. Staatl. Mus. Tierk., Dresden 21 (19): 273-282. (in German).

Koch A, Auliya M, Schmitz A, Kuch U, Böhme W (2007). "Morphological studies on the systematics of south east Asian water monitors (Varanus salvator Complex): nominotypic populations and taxonomic overview". Mertensiella 16: 109-180.
Lagat RD (2009). "A taxonomic account of lizards along established trails in Mts. Palay-Palay Mataas-na-gulod protected landscape, Luzon Island, Philippines". Philippine Journal of Systematic Biology 3: 17-28.
 (Varanus manilensis, new species).
Mertens R (1942). "Die Familie der Warane (Varanidae), 3. Teil: Taxonomie ". Abh. Senckenb. naturf. Ges. 466: 235-391. (Varanus salvator marmoratus, p. 254). (in German).
Reyes MAP, Bennett D, Oliveros C (2008). "The Monitor Lizards of Camiguin Island, Northern Philippines". Biawak 2 (1): 28-36.
Schlegel H (1837). Abbildungen neuer oder unvollständig bekannter Amphibien, nach der Natur oder dem Leben entworfen. Düsseldorf: Arnz & Company. i-xiv + 141 pp. [1837-1844]. (Monitor bivittatus philippensis, new subspecies). (in German).
Wiegmann AFA (1834). In: Meyen FJF (1834). "Beiträge zur Zoologie gesammelt auf einer Reise um die Erde. Siebente Abhandlung. Amphibien ". Nova Acta Acad. Caesar. Leop. Carol., Halle 17: 185-268. (Hydrosaurus marmoratus, new species, pp. 196–201, Plate XIV). (in German and Latin).

Varanus
Reptiles of the Philippines
Reptiles described in 1834
Taxa named by Arend Friedrich August Wiegmann